Louis Charles Achille d'Artois de Bournonville (17 March 1791 - 2 December 1868) was a French writer, libretist and dramatist.

Biography 
A very prolific librettist, his plays have been performed on the most important Parisian stages during his lifetime (Théâtre des Variétés, Théâtre du Vaudeville, Théâtre de la Gaîté, Opéra-Comique, Odéon, Théâtre de la Renaissance...).

Works 

 Les maris ont tort, comédie en vaudevilles in 1 act, 1813
 Pauché ou la curiosité des femmes, comédie anachréontique, in 1 act, mingled with vaudevilles, with Théaulon, 1814
 Le Roi et la Ligue, opéra comique in 2 acts, with Théaulon, 1815
 Turenne, ou Un trait de modestie, with F. de Bury, 1815
 Les visites, tableau vaudeville in 1 act, with Armand d'Artois and Théaulon, 1815
 La Rosière de Hartwell, comedie en vaudevilles on one act, with Armand d'Artois, 1816
 Les perroquets de la mère Philippe, with Armand d'Artois and Emmanuel Théaulon, 1818
 La Saint-Henri, divertissement, with Théodore Anne, 1825
 Le Pâte d'anguille, ou le quiproquo, vaudeville in 1 act, after La Fontaine, 1828
 Les troqueurs, 1819
 Angéline ou la champenoise, comédie in vaudevilles imitated from German, with Emmanuel Théaulon, 1819
 L'Invisible, ou la Curiosité d'une veuve, comédie en vaudevilles in 1 act, with Fulgence de Bury, 1820
 Le Traité de paix, comédie en vaudeville in 1 act, with Brisset, 1821
 Le Coq de village, with Charles-Simon Favart, 1822
 Les Frères rivaux, ou la Prise de tabac, comédie en vaudevilles in 1 act, 1822
 Guillaume, Gautier et Garguille, ou Le Cœur et la pensée, comédie grivoise in 1 act, mingled with couplets, with Gabriel de Lurieu, 1822
 Le père et le tuteur, 5-act comedy, 1822
 La Pauvre Fille, 1-act vaudeville, with Armand d'Artois (1788-1867) and Michel Dieulafoy, 1823
 Le polichinelle sans le savoir, comédie-parade mingled with ariettes, with Armand-François Jouslin de La Salle, 1823
 Les Amours de village, vaudeville in 1 act, 1823
 La Dame des Belles Cousines, vaudeville in 1 act, 1823
 Le Duc d'Aquitaine ou Le Retour, with Emmanuel Théaulon and Felice Blangini, 1823
 Les Femmes volantes, vaudeville-féerie in 2 acts, with E. Théaulon, 1824
 Alfred, ou la Bonne Tête !, vaudeville in 1 act, with Théodore Anne, 1824
 La Curieuse, comédie en vaudevilles in 2 acts, 1824
 Les Deux officiers, vaudeville in 1 act, with Théodore Anne, 1824
 Le Mariage de convenance, comédie en vaudevilles in 2 acts, with Théaulon, 1824
 L'Officier et le paysan, opéra comique in 1 act in prose, with Charles-Frédéric Kreubé, 1824
 Le Retour à la ferme, comédie en vaudevilles in 1 act, with Mathurin-Joseph Brisset, 1824
 La Sorcière des Vosges, vaudeville in 2 acts, 1824
 Belphégor, ou le Bonnet du diable, vaudeville-féerie in 1 act, with Jules-Henri Vernoy de Saint-Georges and Jules Vernet, 1825
 Le Champenois, ou les Mystifications, comédie en vaudevilles in 1 act, 1825
 Les Châtelaines, ou les Nouvelles Amazones, vaudeville in 1 act, with Théodore Anne, 1825
 L'Exilé, vaudeville en 2 actes, with Théodore Anne and Henri de Tully, after Walter Scott, 1825
 La Grand'Maman, ou le Lendemain de noces, comédie en vaudevilles in 1 act, 1825
 Le Bon père, comedy in 1 act, with Ferdinand Laloue, 1827
 Le Caleb, comedy in one acte, with Eugène de Planard, after Walter Scott, 1827
 Les Forgerons, comédie en vaudevilles in 2 acts, 1827
 Le Futur de la grand'maman, with Monnais, 1827
 L'Homme de Paille, comedy in 1 act, mingled with vaudevilles, 1827
 Le Jeu de cache-cache, ou la Fiancée, comedy in 2 acts, 1827
 Les Jolis soldats, with Théaulon, 1827
 Le Mariage à la hussarde, ou une nuit de printemps, one-act comedy, with Emmanuel Théaulon, 1827
 Le Matin et le soir, ou la Fiancée et la mariée, comedy in 2 acts, with Eugène de Lamerlière and Emmanuel Théaulon, 1828
 Le Château de Monsieur le Baron, comédie en vaudevilles in 2 acts, with Adolphe de Leuven, 1828
 Le Brutal, Henri III episode in 2 tableaux, 1829
 Les Suites d'un mariage de raison, drama in 1 act, with Léon Lévy Brunswick and Victor Lhérie, 1829
 La veille et le lendemain ou Il faut bien aimer son mari, comédie en vaudevilles in 2 acts, with Armand d'Artois, 1829
 La Czarine, with Michel Masson, 1830
 L'espionne, with Dupeuty, 1830
 La Lingère du Marais, ou la Nouvelle Manon Lescaut, vaudeville in 3 acts, with Henri Dupin, 1830
 M. Cagnard ou les Conspirateurs, folie du jour in one act, with Nicolas Brazier and Théophile Marion Dumersan, 1831
 L'Ange gardien, ou Sœur Marie, comedy in 2 acts, with Henri Dupin, 1831
 Batardi, ou Le désagrément de n'avoir ni mère, ni père, with Dupin, 1831
 Le Boa, ou le Bossu à la mode, comédie en vaudevilles in 1 act, with Francis Cornu, 1831
 La prima donna ou La sœur de lait, 1832
 Le Fils du Savetier, ou les Amours de Télémaque, vaudeville in one act, with Jules Chabot de Bouin, 1832
 L'aiguillette bleue, historical vaudeville in three acts, with Ernest Jaime and Michel Masson, 1834
 La Chambre de Rossini, canevas à l'italienne, mingled with vaudevilles and new music, with Jean-Toussaint Merle and Antoine Simonnin, 1834
 La jolie voyageuse ou Les deux Giroux, with René de Chazet and Joseph-Bernard Rosier, 1834
 Jean Jean don Juan, parodie en cinq pièces, with Michel-Nicolas Balisson de Rougemont and Charles Dupeuty, 1835
 Un mois de fidélité, with Charles-François-Jean-Baptiste Moreau de Commagny, 1835
 Le Comédien de salon, with Edmond Rochefort, 1836
 Le Jeune père, with Jules-Henri Vernoy de Saint-Georges, 1836
 Scipion, ou le Beau-père, comédie en vaudevilles in 3 acts, with E. Rochefort, 1836
 Trois cœurs de femmes, vaudeville in 3 acts, with Adolphe d'Ennery and Edmond Burat de Gurgy, 1836
 Un frère de quinze ans, comédie en vaudevilles in 1 act, with Alexis Decomberousse, 1838
 Valentine, comédie en vaudeville in 2 acts, with Armand d'Artois, 1839
 Vingt-six ans, comedy in 2 acts, with Armand d'Artois, 1839
 Un jeune caissier, drama in 3 acts, with Théaulon, 1840
 Lucrèce Borgia, opera in 3 acts, with Henri de Saint-Georges, 1840
 Une Idée de médecin, comédie en 1 acte mêlée de couplets, with Armand d'Artois, 1844
 La Gardeuse de dindons, comédie en vaudevilles in 3 acts, with Edmond de Biéville and Emmanuel Théaulon, 1845
 Un domestique pour tout faire, comédie en vaudevilles in 1 act, 1846
 La Fille obéissante, comédie en vaudevilles in 1 act, 1847
 Un Monsieur qui veut exister, vaudeville in 1 act, with Armand d'Artois, 1849
 Un Dieu du jour, comédie en vaudevilles in 2 actes, with Roger de Beauvoir, 1850
 Un bon ouvrier, comédie en vaudevilles, with Joseph-Bernard Rosier, 1852
 Jusqu'à minuit, comédie en vaudevilles in 1 act, 1852
 Le Château de Coetaven, comedy mingled with songs in 1 act, with Galoppe d'Onquaire, 1852
 Reculer pour mieux sauter, proverbe-vaudeville in 1 act, with Armand d'Artois, 1854

Bibliography 
 Gustave Vapereau, Dictionnaire universel des contemporains, 1870
 T. J. Walsh, Second Empire opera: the Théâtre lyrique, Paris 1851-1870, 1981, (p. 341)
 Olivier Bara, Le théâtre de l'opéra-comique sous la restauration, 2001, (p. 116)
 Hector Berlioz, Critique musicale 1823-1863, 2004, (p. 549)

French librettists
19th-century French dramatists and playwrights
People from Noyon
1791 births
1868 deaths